Jay Reynolds is a radio sports and news anchor. He began his reporting and anchoring work in Poughkeepsie, New York radio, having worked the newsrooms of WKIP, WEOK, and WPDH. Currently he is the anchor for ESPN Radio SportsCenter and is the host of SportsCenter AllNight.

Reynolds, being the tallest person on staff at WPDH, was nicknamed The 6-Foot-8 Jay Reynolds.

References

American sports announcers
American radio personalities
Living people
Year of birth missing (living people)